Niall Roberts (born April 22, 1991) is a Guyanese swimmer. He competed at the 2008 Summer Olympics. Roberts came 7th in his heat. He also qualified to compete at the 2012 Summer Olympics in London and at the 2013 World Aquatics Championships in Barcelona.

In 2015, Roberts retired from swimming at 23.

References 

 

Living people
Swimmers at the 2008 Summer Olympics
Swimmers at the 2012 Summer Olympics
Olympic swimmers of Guyana
Guyanese male swimmers
Sportspeople from Georgetown, Guyana
1991 births
Swimmers at the 2011 Pan American Games
Pan American Games competitors for Guyana